In mathematics, the capacity of a set in Euclidean space is a measure of the "size" of that set.  Unlike, say, Lebesgue measure, which measures a set's volume or physical extent, capacity is a mathematical analogue of a set's ability to hold electrical charge.  More precisely, it is the capacitance of the set: the total charge a set can hold while maintaining a given potential energy.  The potential energy is computed with respect to an idealized ground at infinity for the harmonic or Newtonian capacity, and with respect to a surface for the condenser capacity.

Historical note
The notion of capacity of a set and of "capacitable" set was introduced by Gustave Choquet in 1950: for a detailed account, see reference .

Definitions

Condenser capacity

Let Σ be a closed, smooth, (n − 1)-dimensional hypersurface in n-dimensional Euclidean space ℝn, n ≥ 3; K will denote the n-dimensional compact (i.e., closed and bounded) set of which Σ is the boundary.  Let S be another (n − 1)-dimensional hypersurface that encloses Σ: in reference to its origins in electromagnetism, the pair (Σ, S) is known as a condenser.  The condenser capacity of Σ relative to S, denoted C(Σ, S) or cap(Σ, S), is given by the surface integral

where:

 u is the unique harmonic function defined on the region D between Σ and S with the boundary conditions u(x) = 1 on Σ and u(x) = 0 on S;
 S′ is any intermediate surface between Σ and S;
 ν is the outward unit normal field to S′ and

is the normal derivative of u across S′; and
 σn = 2πn⁄2 ⁄ Γ(n ⁄ 2) is the surface area of the unit sphere in ℝn.

C(Σ, S) can be equivalently defined by the volume integral

The condenser capacity also has a variational characterization: C(Σ, S) is the infimum of the Dirichlet's energy functional

over all continuously-differentiable functions v on D with v(x) = 1 on Σ and v(x) = 0 on S.

Harmonic/Newtonian capacity

Heuristically, the harmonic capacity of K, the region bounded by Σ, can be found by taking the condenser capacity of Σ with respect to infinity.  More precisely, let u be the harmonic function in the complement of K satisfying u = 1 on Σ and u(x) → 0 as x → ∞.  Thus u is the Newtonian potential of the simple layer Σ.  Then the harmonic capacity (also known as the Newtonian capacity) of K, denoted C(K) or cap(K), is then defined by

If S is a rectifiable hypersurface completely enclosing K, then the harmonic capacity can be equivalently rewritten as the integral over S of the outward normal derivative of u:

The harmonic capacity can also be understood as a limit of the condenser capacity. To wit, let Sr denote the sphere of radius r about the origin in ℝn.  Since K is bounded, for sufficiently large r, Sr will enclose K and (Σ, Sr) will form a condenser pair.  The harmonic capacity is then the limit as r tends to infinity:

The harmonic capacity is a mathematically abstract version of the electrostatic capacity of the conductor K and is always non-negative and finite: 0 ≤ C(K) < +∞.

Generalizations
The characterization of the capacity of a set as the minimum of an energy functional achieving particular boundary values, given above, can be extended to other energy functionals in the calculus of variations.

Divergence form elliptic operators
Solutions to a uniformly elliptic partial differential equation with divergence form

are minimizers of the associated energy functional 

subject to appropriate boundary conditions.

The capacity of a set E with respect to a domain D containing E is defined as the infimum of the energy over all continuously-differentiable functions v on D with v(x) = 1 on E; and v(x) = 0 on the boundary of D.

The minimum energy is achieved by a function known as the capacitary potential of E with respect to D, and it solves the obstacle problem on D with the obstacle function provided by the indicator function of E. The capacitary potential is alternately characterized as the unique solution of the equation with the appropriate boundary conditions.

See also
Analytic capacity
Capacitance
Newtonian potential
Potential theory

References
 . The second edition of these lecture notes, revised and enlarged with the help of S. Ramaswamy, re–typeset, proof read once and freely available for download.
, available from Gallica. A historical account of the development of capacity theory by its founder and one of the main contributors; an English translation of the title reads: "The birth of capacity theory: reflections on a personal experience".

, available at NUMDAM.
 
 

Potential theory